The Gravel Institute is a progressive left-wing advocacy group that aims to counteract American conservative think tanks in general, particularly PragerU. The Gravel Institute is named for its founder Mike Gravel, a former United States senator from Alaska and two-time U.S. presidential candidate.

The Gravel Institute promotes left-wing views, including wealth redistribution, critique of United States foreign policy, and supporting direct democracy.

Mission 
The Gravel Institute was created with the explicit goal of countering PragerU, with Henry Williams stating "the issues that we've so far focused on were, on the one hand, drawn from looking at PragerU topics and countering them" in an interview with Salon. The Gravel Institute has collaborated with a number of organizations, including the People's Policy Project (3P) and the Economic Policy Institute (EPI).

According to the official website, the Institute's mission is to "build the institutions the left needs to win". According to David Oks, the Institute's "main target audience is people who are in the center, but don't have particularly well-thought-out political beliefs", adding: "I don't really think we're going to be converting people who consume PragerU."

History
After Mike Gravel's 2020 presidential campaign ended in 2019, leadership from the campaign launched The Gravel Institute in 2019 using a $25,000 donation by Tumblr founder David Karp.

The Gravel Institute is mainly run by Williams, Oks, and Henry Magowan, who ran Gravel's 2020 presidential campaign when they were teenagers. Video production and direction is headed by New York filmmaker Tymon Brown. Mike Gravel himself, who was 90 years old when the institute launched, was not involved in day-to-day operations but served as a consultant and provided advice.

On September 28, 2020, The Gravel Institute uploaded their first video, formally introducing the project, narrated by H. Jon Benjamin. Also on September 28, The Gravel Institute uploaded their first video focused on a specific subject.

In February 2022, The Gravel Institute announced a new board of directors, including former Ohio State Senator Nina Turner and Bhaskar Sunkara, the founder of American socialist magazine Jacobin.

In February 2022, The Daily Beast alleged that a video released by The Gravel Institute in mid-February on the Azov Battalion, titled "How America Funded Ukraine’s Neo-Nazis" and later renamed "America, Russia, and Ukraine’s Far-Right Problem", containing controversial talking points about the influence of neo-Nazism in the Ukrainian government. The Gravel Institute said the video was accurate and was reviewed by experts prior to publication, but the video was ultimately pulled from public view.

Presenters and contributors 

Presenters and contributors to Gravel Institute videos have included Zephyr Teachout, David Cross, Bhaskar Sunkara, Richard Wolff, and H. Jon Benjamin.

Board of directors 
As of 2022, the group's board of directors are Jabari Brisport, Enigma founder Hicham Oudghiri, Veena Dubal, and Nina Turner.

Jacobin founder Bhaskar Sunkara was initially listed on the board as well.

References

Primary sources 
In the text these references are preceded by a double dagger (‡):

Mike Gravel
Progressive organizations in the United States